Azarsetanaki (also Romanized as Āzārsetānakī; also known as Āzārsetān) is a village in Ahandan Rural District, in the Central District of Lahijan County, Gilan Province, Iran. At the 2006 census, its population was 261, in 82 families.

References 

Populated places in Lahijan County